Carlentini (Sicilian: Carruntini) is a town and comune in the Province of Syracuse, Sicily (Italy). It lies 45 km (28 mi) outside the provincial capital of Syracuse.

The city's name has its origins in the neighboring town of Lentini.  In 1551, Vice-King Giovanni De Vega founded a new city in honour of Emperor Carlo V, naming it in Latin Carleontini, or Leontini of Carlo.  In Italian, it became Carlentini, and in the various Sicilian dialects, Carrintini or Carruntini.

Among the churches in town are: 
Chiesa Madre dedicated to the Immacolata Concezione
Santa Maria di Roccadia
San Sebastiano
Madonna delle Grazie

Twin towns – sister cities
Carlentini is twinned with:
 Santa Luċija, Malta

-Friend City with Omaha (Nebraska) USA

See also
 1990 Carlentini earthquake

References

Municipalities of the Province of Syracuse
Populated places established in 1551
1551 establishments in the Spanish Empire